Cogger's emo skink (Emoia coggeri) is a species of lizard in the family Scincidae. The species is endemic to Papua New Guinea.

Etymology
The specific name, coggeri, is in honor of Australian herpetologist Harold George "Hal" Cogger.

Habitat
The preferred natural habitat of E. coggeri is unknown.

Reproduction
E. coggeri is oviparous. Clutch size is two eggs.

References

Further reading
Brown WC (1991). "Lizards of the Genus Emoia (Scincidae) with Observations on Their Evolution and Biogeography". Memoirs of the California Academy of Sciences (15): i–vi, 1–94. (Emoia coggeri, new species, p. 34).

Emoia
Reptiles described in 1991
Reptiles of Papua New Guinea
Endemic fauna of Papua New Guinea
Taxa named by Walter Creighton Brown
Skinks of New Guinea